In computer science, Uniform consensus is a distributed computing problem that is a similar to the consensus problem with one more condition which is no two processes (whether faulty or not) decide differently.

More specifically one should consider this problem:
 Each process has an input, should on decide an output (one-shot problem)
 Uniform Agreement: every two decisions are the same
 Validity: every decision is an input of one of the processes
 Termination: eventually all correct processes decide

References 
 

Distributed computing problems